The Tahekeroa River is a river of the Auckland Region of New Zealand's North Island. It flows generally southwest to reach the Makarau River eight kilometres north of Kaukapakapa.

See also
List of rivers of New Zealand

References

Rivers of the Auckland Region
Manukau Harbour catchment